Ángel Luis Pérez Pérez (born 21 February 1981 in Avilés, Asturias), sometimes known simply as Ángel, is a Spanish former footballer who played as a right back.

External links

1981 births
Living people
People from Avilés
Spanish footballers
Footballers from Asturias
Association football defenders
La Liga players
Segunda División players
Segunda División B players
Tercera División players
Divisiones Regionales de Fútbol players
Real Oviedo Vetusta players
Real Oviedo players
RCD Mallorca players
Córdoba CF players
CD Numancia players
CF Palencia footballers
Marino de Luanco footballers
Racing de Ferrol footballers